The Monument of Andrés Bello is an instance of public art in Madrid, Spain.

History and description 
The sculpture depicts a full-body standing figure of Bello, holding his famous Spanish Grammar book for Americans with his right hand. The bronze is on top of a granite pedestal. It can be considered part of wider plan of the Francoist regime for the construction of memorials in the Spanish capital trying to complement its programme of Ibero-American cooperation with symbolical content, also featuring other works dedicated to the likes of Simón Bolívar, José de San Martín, José Gervasio Artigas, Vasco Núñez de Balboa, Rubén Darío or the Hispanidad itself. 

Lobbied by Venezuelan ambassador Carlos Capriles Ayala, the monument was unveiled on 26 April 1972, during a ceremony presided by Gregorio López Bravo (Minister of Foreign Affairs) and Alfredo Sánchez Bella (Minister of Information and Tourism), Edgar Sanabria (Venezuelan representative), Carlos Arias Navarro (Mayor of Madrid) and diplomats in representation of a number of Latin American republics.

References 
Citations

Bibliography
 
 

Bronze sculptures in Spain
Outdoor sculptures in Madrid
Sculptures of men in Spain
Buildings and structures in Ciudad Universitaria neighborhood, Madrid
Monuments and memorials in Madrid
Statues of writers